Moses Kunkuyu is a Malawi politician who currently serves as the Minister of Information and Civic Education. He is also a Member of Parliament in the National Assembly of Malawi.

Political career

Kunkuyu is one of the youngest politicians in the country. In 2009, he was elected Member of Parliament for the Blantyre south constituency on a Democratic Progressive Party ticket. Following the unpopularity of the Bingu wa Mutharika administration, Kunkuyu alleged in an interview for Zodiak Radio, Malawi that the advisors to the Party leadership were "too timid" to face him to Mutharika, and that the Party was living a lie. He subsequently formed the Hope Alliance, a pressure group within the Party seeking to influence change from within to the Mutharika government. This led to a hostile response from the government. Following the succession of Joyce Banda to the Malawi Presidency, Kunkuyu was appointed Minister of Information and Civic Education.

References 

Government ministers of Malawi
Living people
Year of birth missing (living people)
People from Blantyre
Democratic Progressive Party (Malawi) politicians
People's Party (Malawi) politicians
Members of the National Assembly (Malawi)